Barbara Jo Allen (born Marian Barbara Henshall; September 2, 1906 – September 14, 1974) was an American actress. She was also known as Vera Vague, the spinster character she created and portrayed on radio and in films during the 1940s and 1950s. She based the character on a woman she had seen delivering a PTA literature lecture in a confused manner. As Vague, she popularized the catch phrase "You dear boy!"

Early years
Allen was born on September 2, 1906, in Manhattan, New York, to Charles Thomas Henshall and Grace Esther Selby. Following her mother's death when Allen was 9, she went to live with an aunt and uncle in Los Angeles. She was educated at Los Angeles High School, UCLA, Stanford University, and the Sorbonne. Her acting ability first surfaced in school plays. Concentrating on language at the Sorbonne, she became proficient in French, Spanish, German and Italian.

Film, radio and television
In 1933, Allen joined the cast of NBC's One Man's Family as Beth Holly, followed by roles on Death Valley Days, I Love a Mystery and other radio series. According to Allen, her Vera Vague character was "sort of a frustrated female, dumb, always ambitious and overzealous… a spouting bureau of misinformation." After Vera was introduced in 1939 on NBC Matinee, she became a regular with Bob Hope beginning in 1941. In the early 1940s, she was a regular on Signal Carnival, a weekly program on NBC-Pacific Red stations.

Allen appeared in at least 60 movies and TV series between 1938 and 1963, often credited as Vera Vague rather than her own name. The character she created was so popular that she eventually adopted the character name as her professional name. From 1943 to 1952, as Vera, she made more than a dozen comedy two-reel short subjects for Columbia Pictures, two of which were nominated for Oscars in the Academy Award for Best Live Action Short Film category.

In 1948, she did less acting and instead opened her own commercial orchid business, while also serving as the Honorary Mayor of Woodland Hills, California. In 1953, as Vera, she hosted her own television series, Follow the Leader, a CBS audience participation show.

Animation
She also did voices for animation, especially for the Walt Disney Animation Studios, most notably as the voice of Fauna, the green fairy, in Sleeping Beauty (1959), Goliath II's mother in Goliath II (1960), and the Scullery Maid in The Sword in the Stone (1963), her final film role.

Hollywood Walk of Fame
As Vera Vague, Allen has two stars on the Hollywood Walk of Fame, one for motion pictures at 1720 Vine Street and one for radio at 1639 Vine Street. Both were dedicated February 8, 1960.

Personal life
Allen's first marriage was to actor Barton Yarborough. They had one child together, Joan. In 1946, the couple co-starred in the two-reel comedy short, Hiss and Yell, nominated for an Academy Award as Best Short Subject. Allen married lumberman Charles Hopper Crosby October 19, 1931, in Reno, Nevada.

Death
Allen died September 14, 1974, aged 68, in Santa Barbara, California. She was cremated at Santa Barbara Cemetery on September 17 and her ashes were scattered in the Pacific.

Filmography
Features:

The Rookie Cop (1939) – Mrs. Thomas (uncredited)
The Women (1939) – Receptionist (uncredited)
Village Barn Dance (1940) – Vera
Broadway Melody of 1940 (1940) – Ms. Konk (uncredited)
Sing, Dance, Plenty Hot (1940) – Susan
Melody and Moonlight (1940) – Adelaide Barnett
Melody Ranch (1940) – Veronica Whipple
The Mad Doctor (1941) – Louise Watkins
Kiss the Boys Goodbye (1941) – Myra Stanhope
Ice-Capades (1941) – Vera Vague
Buy Me That Town (1941) – Henriette Teagarden
Design for Scandal (1941) – Jane
Larceny, Inc. (1942) – Mademoiselle Gloria
Priorities on Parade (1942) – Mariposa Ginsbotham 
Hi, Neighbor (1942) – Vera Greenfield 
Mrs. Wiggs of the Cabbage Patch (1942) – Miss Tabitha Hazy 
The Palm Beach Story (1942) – Lady coming out of ladies room on train during the posse episode (uncredited)
Ice-Capades Revue (1942) – Aunt Nellie
Swing Your Partner (1943) – Vera Vague
Get Going (1943) – Matilda Jones 
Cowboy Canteen (1944) – Vera Vague
Moon Over Las Vegas (1944) – Auntie 
Henry Aldrich Plays Cupid (1944) – Mrs. Terwilliger aka Blue Eyes 
Rosie the Riveter (1944) – Vera Watson 
Girl Rush (1944) – Suzie Banks 
Lake Placid Serenade (1944) – Countess
Snafu (1945) – Madge Stevens 
Earl Carroll Sketchbook (1946) – Sherry Lane
Square Dance Katy (1950) – Gypsy Jones 
Mohawk (1956) – Aunt Agatha 
The Opposite Sex (1956) – Dolly DeHaven
Sleeping Beauty (1959) – Fauna (voice)
Born to Be Loved (1959) – Irene Hoffman 
The Sword in the Stone (1963) – Scullery Maid (voice) (final film role)

Short Subjects:

Major Difficulties (1938)
Moving Vanities (1939) – Mrs. Errol
Ring Madness (1939) – Mrs. Errol
Kennedy the Great (1939) – Mrs. John Potter
Meet the Stars #1: Chinese Garden Festival (1940) – Vera Vague
You Dear Boy (1943) – Vera
Doctor, Feel My Pulse (1944) – Vera Vague
Strife of the Party (1944) – Vera Clayton 
She Snoops to Conquer (1944) – Vera, the Reporter 
Screen Snapshots Series 24, No. 3 (1944) – Vera Vague
The Jury Goes Round 'n' Round (1945) – Vera Vague 
Screen Snapshots: Radio Shows (1945) – Vera Vague 
Calling All Fibbers (1945) – Vera Vague 
Hiss and Yell (1946) – Vera Vague 
Headin' for a Weddin''' (1946) – Vera Vague Reno-Vated (1946) – Vera ButtsCupid Goes Nuts (1947) – Vera VagueScreen Snapshots: Off the Air (1947) – Vera VagueScreen Snapshots: Smiles and Styles (1948) – Vera VagueSitka Sue (1948) – Vera VagueA Lass in Alaska (1948) – Vera Vague A Miss in a Mess (1949) – *Clunked in the Clink (1949) – Vera Vague Wha' Happen? (1949) – VeraClunked in the Clink (1949) – Vera Vague Nursie Behave (1950) – Vera Vague She Took a Powder (1951) – Vera Vague Happy Go Wacky (1952) – Vera Vague Screen Snapshots: Hollywood Life (1954) – Vera VagueGoliath II'' (1960) – Goliath II's Mother (voice, uncredited)

References

External links

1906 births
1974 deaths
Actresses from New York City
American expatriates in France
American film actresses
American radio actresses
University of Paris alumni
20th-century American actresses
Columbia Pictures contract players